12 Days of Terror is a 2004 television film directed by Jack Sholder and starring Colin Egglesfield, Mark Dexter, Jenna Harrison and John Rhys-Davies. Based on a true story, it revolves around the 1916 Jersey shark attacks, as recounted in the book of the same name by Richard Fernicola, in which a juvenile great white shark begins a series of attacks that takes place of the course of 12 days in New Jersey. On 1 May 2004, it premiered on Animal Planet and later on the Discovery Channel.

Plot
On 1 July 1916, in New Jersey during WWI, local lifeguard Alex Trednot (Colin Egglesfield) watches over one of the beaches. After grilling fellow lifeguard Danny Bruder (Jean Michel Joubert), Alex is approached by best friend Stanley Fisher (Mark Dexter) and ex-girlfriend Alice (Jenna Harrison) on his opinion for a wedding cake. Meanwhile, beachgoer Charles Van Sant is attacked by an unseen force. Alex and four other lifeguards rush to save Charles, however his left leg is injured. Alex believes it was a shark, but because he didn't see it clearly, his story is dismissed and the beaches remain open. However, a local boat Captain "Cap" (John Rhys-Davies) believes Alex, having hunted sharks much of his life. Alex tries to convince Mayor Perillo (Patrick Lyster) to close the beaches, but he says he cannot unless experts confirm it is a shark. This disappoints Alex.

Later that evening, President Woodrow Wilson visits the Jersey Shore and gives a speech about change and safety from war. Commissioner Meel (Paul Ditchfiel), Alex's boss, once again assures Alex the attack won't happen again. Alice comes to Alex and asks him that, despite being happy for both her and Stan, if he has any regrets, to which he asks her the same. On 7 July, after Charles Van Sant died, many more people come to the beaches. When Danny goes out to retrieve two swimmers venturing too far from shore, he too is attacked. Alex and other divers rescue him, but both his legs are gone and he quickly dies. Now knowing it's a shark, Alex approaches Meel and berates him, reminding him of what he said and how wrong he was. Alex quits as a result.

In New York City, wild animal wrangler Michael Schleisser (Jamie Bartlett) reads about the shark attacks and decides to go to New Jersey. At a press conference, Museum Director Dr. Frederick Lucas (Roger Dwyer) and Ichthyologist Dr. John Nichols (Colin Stinton) address they're investigating the shark attacks as well as attempting to prevent another. Meanwhile, Stan finds Alex in a restaurant and tries to convince him to retake his job. But Alex refuses, saying he won't work for someone willing to let people get hurt for good business. After Stan leaves, Cap comes to Alex and offers him a job to help put up steel nets to prevent another shark attack. While putting the fence together, one person on Cap's boat thinks he sees the shark and fires into the water, unintentionally hitting one of the divers.

With the steel net in place, the beaches reopen. A group of boys ask Stan to play baseball with them. Alex and Stan have a talk and the two forgive each other. Dr. Nichols meets with Alex and asks him about the shark. Elsewhere in a basket factory, Lester works on putting baskets together. His friends ask him to join them in the river, but Lester is working and isn't off yet until his dad says so. Cap stands atop a bridge and notices the shark swimming into Matawan Creek. He makes a call about it, but is deemed crazy.

Cap goes up the river, eventually reaching a small town and tries to warn everybody to stay away from the river. However, Lester and his friends are attacked by the shark. Stan and his friends run to the river to save Lester. However, they do not find him. Cap finds Alex and warns him about the shark. Hours pass and even when putting a net to catch Lester, they still don't find him. The shark is still around and scrapes one of the men searching for Lester. Stan's friends give up, but Stan stays to find him. After a few moments, he finally finds Lester. The next instant, the shark attacks and Stan drops the boy. Alex beats the shark with a pebble, causing it to let go of Stan. The shark swims away. While Cap follows the shark, Alex rushes to get Stan to a doctor.

A mother having a picnic with her daughters notices the shark coming downstream towards a group of boys swimming. She tries to warn them, but one of them is attacked. Cap arrives in time and rams the shark, forcing it to release the boy. The shark swims downstream back to the ocean. While on a train on his way to a hospital, Stan dies from shock and bloodless. This event saddens both Alex and Alice. Later, townsfolk launch dynamite and fire winchesters into the river to kill the shark. Later, on 12 July, Cap apparently "captures" the shark. Alex goes into a hotel and consults with Dr. Nicholes, who confirms that Alex is looking for a juvenile great white shark, although he considers the possibility of a bull shark since it swam upriver. Nicholes tells Alex to find the shark where it has been successful, but not to find it alone.

Alex meets Michael Schleisser and the two talk about the shark. Alex confirms that he is not willing to kill the shark for money nor revenge, only that he doesn't want anyone else killed. Alex approaches Cap and confirms with him the shark he killed is the wrong shark. Feeling sympathy for the Cap since people called him crazy, Alex says that they can find the real shark. Alex and Cap go together to kill the shark. While searching for and even encountering the shark itself (a 12-plus-footer), Cap and Alex meet with Schleisser, who has a net under his small boat to capture the shark. The shark reappears and gets itself caught in the net. It tows Schleisser in its net, hoping it will tire itself out and die. At one point it stops and tips Schleisser over. Alex and Cap manage to save Schleisser and Alex traps the shark even more before it can escape. After several hours, the shark dies from exhaustion.

The group takes the shark back to land and hang it up for everybody to see. Dr. Nichols confirms it to be a juvenile great white. Alex asks Dr. Nichols about becoming an ichthyologist and says to meet him in his office. After that, Alex and Alice get back together. After the shark was finally captured offshore, an autopsy was performed, and it is said that 15 pounds of human flesh with bones were found in its stomach. In the end, four people were killed, a fifth badly injured, and Lester's remains were recovered. Because a propensity for human flesh is unnatural in sharks, scientists are still investigating why this shark did what it did.

Cast
 Colin Egglesfield as Alex
 Mark Dexter as Stanley Fisher (victim)|
 Jenna Harrison as Alice
 John Rhys-Davies as Captain
 Jamie Bartlett as Michael Schleisser  
 Adrian Galley as Engel
 Colin Stinton as Dr. John Treadwell Nichols
 Roger Dwyer as Dr. Frederic Lucas
 Craig Geldenhuys as Arnie
 George Christopher Smith as Michael Dunn
 Andrew Mark Smith as Joseph Dunn

References

External links

2004 television films
2004 films
Seafaring films based on actual events
Films based on non-fiction books
Films about shark attacks
2000s English-language films
English-language South African films
Films set in New Jersey
Films about sharks
Films set in 1916
Films directed by Jack Sholder